Pat Shannon may refer to:

Pat Shannon, see 2010 in Ireland#Winter Olympics
Pat Shannon, see Come to the Sunshine: Soft Pop Nuggets from the WEA Vaults

See also
Patrick Shannon (disambiguation)